DeAudra Dix (born March 3, 1984) is a professional American football defensive back who is currently a free agent He was signed as a street free agent by the Montreal Alouettes in 2009. He played college football for the Johnson C. Smith Golden Bulls. In 2008, his senior year at Johnson C. Smith University he was named to the Division II First-team All-American.

Professional career

Montreal Alouettes
He recorded his first career interception on September 13, 2009 against the BC Lions in a 28–24 Montreal Alouettes win.

Tampa Bay Storm
Dix signed with the Tampa Bay Storm of the Arena Football League for the 2013 season. Dix was placed on injury reserve before the final week of the regular season, and missed the team's playoff game.

Los Angeles KISS
Dix was assigned to the Los Angeles KISS on March 17, 2015. On May 19, 2015, Dix was placed on reassignment by the KISS.

Career Statistics

References

External links
Montreal Alouettes bio

1984 births
Living people
People from Merritt Island, Florida
American players of Canadian football
Canadian football defensive backs
American football defensive backs
Johnson C. Smith Golden Bulls football players
Montreal Alouettes players
African-American players of Canadian football
Tampa Bay Storm players
Los Angeles Kiss players